Garigny is a commune in the Cher department in the Centre-Val de Loire region of France.

Geography
The river Vauvise flows east through the northern part of the commune.

Population

Sights
 The church of Notre-Dame, dating from the twelfth century.
 Vestiges of Roman occupation at Vauvrille.
 The chateau of Doys, the seat of the Marquis de Rolland-Dalon.

See also
Communes of the Cher department

References

Communes of Cher (department)